Musika  is a music video game created for the iPod by Masaya Matsuura. Originally called Rhythmica, Musika was created exclusively for the iPod click wheel interface and is considered similar in format to the rhythm game, Phase, also for iPod. Matsuura has said in interviews that his decision to make the game for the iPod was a simple decision because "[m]any years ago Apple's tools first opened [his] eyes to the power of music and multimedia, so it's exciting [for him] to release [his] first game for this device."

Gameplay 
Musika is a music-generated game and as such it is played using the songs already on the iPod it is played on. To play, the player selects a song from the list of all songs available and plays it. As the music plays, the player is challenged to press the Select button (the only button used to play the game) as soon as a character (letter or number) from the song's title appears in the field. The faster this is done, the more points are earned. For every 5 letters selected correctly and for every completed song, score multipliers build up the more correct letters you get in a row. High scores can lead to development of bonus icons, which act to protect the player against misses, passes and blocks.

References

External links
 The Musika page on Apple.com

 The Official Musika Website

2007 video games
IPod games
Music generated games
Music video games
NanaOn-Sha games
Single-player video games
Video games developed in Japan
Video games with custom soundtrack support